68 is a compilation album by Robert Wyatt. It is composed of previously unreleased demos Wyatt recorded in 1968 at the end of a tour Soft Machine did with the Jimi Hendrix Experience in the United States. It was released by Cuneiform Records in 2013.

After the tour, the Experience had given Wyatt access to their recording studios after hours, and he recorded these demos there. Hendrix played bass guitar on one of the recordings, "Slow Walkin' Talk". Some of the tracks were later reworked and used on several Soft Machine and Matching Mole albums.

Release
'68 was released on 8 October 2013 on LP in a limited edition, and on CD and digital. Three further limited edition LP pressings were released in 2014.

Vinyl
1st pressing – 8 October 2013 – White – 500 copies
2nd pressing – January 2014 – Sky Blue – 600 copies
3rd pressing – September 2014 – Gold/Yellow – 250 copies
4th pressing – September 2014 – Blue – 250 copies

CD
8 October 2013 – Sound Performance pressings
8 October 2013 – Disc Makers pressings

Digital
8 October 2013 – includes a bonus track, "Rivmic Melodies (Radio Edit)"

Reception

Writing at AllMusic, Thom Jurek said Cuneiform Records has "delivered a Holy Grail" with this album, considering that some of the recordings were believed lost, or not to have been made at all. He said that the cleaning and remastering has produced an "excellent" sound, and he described the compilation as "All killer, no filler".

In a review in PopMatters, Maria Schurr called '68 "especially edifying to Soft Machine die-hards", and a "great ... lost musical treasure". Rolling Stone called the album "By far one of the year’s best releases".

Track listing

Personnel
Robert Wyatt – vocals, piano, electric piano, Hammond organ, bass guitar, drums, percussion
Jimi Hendrix – bass guitar (track 3)
Hugh Hopper – bass guitar (track 4)
Mike Ratledge – Lowrey organ (track 4)

Notes

References

External links

2013 compilation albums
Robert Wyatt albums
albums produced by Robert Wyatt
Cuneiform Records compilation albums